The 1980 Tooth Cup was the 7th edition of the NSWRFL Midweek Cup, a NSWRFL-organised national club Rugby League tournament between the leading clubs and representative teams from the NSWRFL, the BRL, the CRL, the QRL and the NZRL.

A total of 16 teams from across Australia and New Zealand played 23 matches in a round-robin format with teams playing 2 games each with the top 8 teams advanced to a knockout stage, with the matches being held midweek during the premiership season.

Qualified Teams

Venues

Round 1

Round 2

Quarter finals

Semi finals

Final

Player of the Series
 Peter Sterling (Parramatta)

Golden Try
 John Dorahy (Manly-Warringah)

Sources
 https://web.archive.org/web/20070927025237/http://users.hunterlink.net.au/~maajjs/aus/nsw/sum/nsw1980.htm

1980
1980 in Australian rugby league
1980 in New Zealand rugby league